Adil Khan (born 3 February 1983 in Oslo, Norway) is a Norwegian dancer and actor of mixed Punjabi and Pashtun descent. He won Dansefeber, hosted by TVNorge in 2006.

Life

Early life

Adil Khan was born  in Oslo, Norway. In his early childhood, he lived at Munkelia. Later, his family moved to Grønland and then to an area close to Ullevål Stadion. Khan's father is from the Punjab province of Pakistan, and his mother is a Pashtun who has her roots in Afghanistan. Khan is the younger brother of film director and human rights activist Deeyah Khan.

Music and dance

In 2009 Khan was invited to sing Michael Jackson's "Man in the Mirror" for Auma Obama, the half-sister of President Barack Obama. The programme was arranged by NRK1 in connection with a fund-raising campaign for Africa.

In 1999, Khan, together with his friends, founded the dance group Floor Knights. Khan has also lived in Copenhagen where he was a member of the breakdance group Natural Effects. He has won several dance competitions in Norway and abroad, such as B-boy Rumble 1999 (Norwegian championship), Scandinavian Battle of the Year 2001, and Time 2 Battle in Malmö (Scandinavian championship). His breakthrough came in 2006 when he won the Norwegian national dance competition Dansefeber in its inaugural season. After winning season 1 of Dansefeber, he left for Los Angeles where he joined Quest Crew (winners of the third season of America's Best Dance Crew).

Actor
After winning Dansefeber, Khan started receiving offers from national Norwegian theaters for acting jobs. His acting debut came in 2006 at Oslo Nye Teater as Bernardo in West Side Story. He returned to Norway in 2007. The first play, after his arrival was The Nutcracker which followed by several other productions. Khan received critical acclaim for his performance in The Jungle Book as Mowgli, which got him the nomination for Hedda Award in the best male role category. Khan is the youngest actor in Norway to ever be nominated for the award.

Miscellaneous
Khan was a presenter for entertainment program named  Adils hemmelige dansere( Adil's secret dancers). This was a two series program presented at NRK1 in 2013 and 2014. Adils hemmelige dansere was a Norwegian version of Ashley Banjo's Secret Street Crew. Both series were nominated for Gullruten award as a best reality program.
Khan served as a judge on Norske Talenter (series 4) during 2011 and (Series 5) 2012. Norske Talenter (Norwegian Talents) is a Norwegian version of Got Talent series. It is a talent show that features singers, dancers, magicians, comedians and other performers of all ages competing for the specified prize. The programme is being presented by TV 2 since 2008.

Acting career

Film/TV

Theatre

Honors and awards
 In 2010, he was assigned as goodwill ambassador for UNICEF Norway.
 In 2008, Adil received Oslo City art award at Oslo City Hall by Oslo Municipality for his contributions in Oslo's artistic life.
 In 2006-2007, Adil Khan became the first goodwill ambassador for FRI (an anti smoking and anti drugs campaign initiated by Norwegian Directorate for Health and Social Affairs).
 On 31 May 2006, Adil was awarded by Norwegian Cancer Society for his work among the youth.

References

External links
 
 

1983 births
Living people
Norwegian male dancers
Norwegian male film actors
Norwegian male stage actors
Norwegian male television actors
Norwegian people of Punjabi descent
Norwegian people of Pashtun descent
Norwegian people of Pakistani descent
Dansefeber contestants
So You Think You Can Dance winners